Ashok Prashar (Pappi) (born November 28, 1964) is an Aam Aadmi Party politician from Punjab. Currently, he represents the Ludhiana Central Assembly constituency.

Political career
In 2022, he won the Ludhiana Central on an Aam Aadmi Party ticket, he defeated Surinder Kumar Dawar of Congress and Gurdev Sharma Debi of BJP.  The Aam Aadmi Party gained a strong 79% majority in the sixteenth Punjab Legislative Assembly by winning 92 out of 117 seats in the 2022 Punjab Legislative Assembly election. MP Bhagwant Mann was sworn in as Chief Minister on 16 March 2022.

MLA 
Pioneered the program to add a dose of vitamins, antioxidants, and proteins through fruits and cheese to 4000 midday meals. He further ensured to keep a regular check on the reform initiated and well-executed.
Committee assignments of Punjab Legislative Assembly  
Member (2022–23) Committee on Petitions 
Member (2022–23) Committee on Questions & References

Electoral performance

References

External links
 
 
 

Living people
1963 births
People from Ludhiana district
Punjabi people
Punjab, India MLAs 2022–2027
Aam Aadmi Party politicians from Punjab, India